Hamferð is a Faroese doom metal band from Tórshavn, Faroe Islands, which formed in 2008.

Biography
John Egholm (guitar) founded the band in 2008; he called Remi Johannesen (drums) and they started jamming. The first show was in a band competition called GBOB (Global Battle Of The Bands) and Hamferð actually reached the national final of the competition. Meanwhile, Theodor Kapnas (guitar), who was studying audio engineering in Sweden, joined the band and most of the writing happened online. At that time Hamferð were joined by current keyboard member Esmar Joensen to complete the lineup. During fall of 2009 Hamferð recorded their first demo, containing the tracks "Opið Hav" and "Ódn" and, in January 2010, joined another band competition in the Faroe Islands called Sement. Theodor, Tinna, and Jón were all abroad. Consequently, Jón handled the vocals and two stand-in members were chosen: Harald í Kálvalíð (guitar) and Jenus í Trøðini (bass).

During summer 2010 Hamferð appeared on several well-known festivals in the Faroe Islands, including Summarfestivalurin and the G! Festival. Shortly after their concerts on both festivals Kerrang! critiqued their performances and handed them an impressive 4 out of 5 stars.

After parting ways with Tinna Tótudóttir (replaced by Jenus í Trøðini) in November/December 2011, Hamferð supported the Dead Tyrants European Tour, including Finnish pagan metal band Moonsorrow and Faroese folk metal band Týr. In December 2011, Jón Aldará stated that the band was concentrating on writing new music for its first full-length album. The album, Evst, was eventaually released in 2013. On 24 March 2012, the band won the Faroese edition of Wacken Metal Battle, getting the chance to play at Wacken Open Air 2012. On 3 August 2012, the band won even this competition, getting also a worldwide record deal with the German label Nuclear Blast.

In December 2012 Hamferð won a Faroese music prize at the annual Planet Awards in the category Band of the Year. Two years earlier Hamferð won a Planet Award in the category Best new band of the year Hamferðs' main influence is said to be the Faroe Islands themselves, "where the sea and the long cold winter play the major role as main contributors."

In early January 2014, lead singer Jón Aldará also joined the Finnish band Barren Earth - replacing former vocalist and founder Mikko Kotamäki, who had parted ways with the band "due to conflicting schedules."

Members

Current members
Jón Aldará - vocals (2008–present)
Eyðun í Geil Hvannastein - guitars (2020–present)
Theodor Kapnas – guitars (2009–present)
Esmar Joensen – keyboards (2009–present)
Ísak Petersen - bass (2014–present)
Remi Kofoed Johannesen - drums (2008–present)

Former members
Tinna Tótudóttir - bass (2008–2011)
Jenus Í Trøðini - bass (2011–2014)
John Áki Egholm – guitars (2008–2020)

Discography
Vilst er síðsta fet (2010)
Evst (2013)
Támsins likam (2018)

References

External links
Hamferð on Myspace
Hamferð official website

Faroese musical groups
Doom metal musical groups
Wacken Metal Battle winners